Alison O'Donnell is a Scottish television, stage and film actress from Motherwell. She is known for her ongoing role as Detective Sergeant Alison 'Tosh' McIntosh in the BBC crime drama series Shetland.

Early life
O'Donnell was born in the early 1980s and grew up in Motherwell with two older sisters. She initially studied international law at university but dropped out after three months to take up acting.

Career
Early in her acting career O'Donnell mainly worked in theatre, featuring in productions of Boys, The Hard Man, Eigengrau, and Yerma. She had small roles in BBC television productions Feel the Force (2006) and Holby City (2012). She played a lead role in My Romantic History, a play at the Edinburgh Fringe which won the 2011 Fringe First award.

From 2013 to present she has appeared in the recurring role of DS Alison 'Tosh' McIntosh, in the Scottish television crime drama, Shetland made by ITV Studios for the BBC.

In 2017 she was part of the cast of the BBC Radio 4 play Synonymous, written by her husband, D.C. Jackson.

Personal life
O'Donnell's partner is Scottish playwright D.C. Jackson; they have two children. They met while O'Donnell played the lead role in Jackson's play, My Romantic History, at the Traverse in Edinburgh, but only became a couple later.

Filmography

References

External links
 

Living people
Scottish film actresses
Scottish television actresses
Year of birth missing (living people)